Chelsey Johnson is an American author and professor, known for her 2018 debut novel Stray City.

Stray City takes place in Portland, Oregon in the 1990s and is told in partial epistolary style. It tells the story of a young lesbian who has a fling with a man, gets pregnant, and decides to keep the baby while dealing with the fallout from her community. Johnson lived in Portland from 2002-2009; the book was released with its own online mixtape.

Johnson is an associate professor of fiction and coordinates the creative writing program at Northern Arizona University. Prior to coming to NAU, she taught at the College of William and Mary and at Oberlin College.

Johnson was born in Northern Minnesota. She received an MFA from the Iowa Writers’ Workshop. She has written for Ploughshares, The Rumpus, Elle, One Story, and NPR’s Selected Shorts, and was an editor of OUT Magazine.

Johnson was awarded a Stegner Fellowship from Stanford University in 2003. She has also received fellowships to the MacDowell Colony and the Virginia Center for Creative Arts. She currently lives in Flagstaff, Arizona with her partner.

References

External links
 Personal website

Living people
21st-century American novelists
American women novelists
21st-century American women writers
American LGBT novelists
Iowa Writers' Workshop alumni
Year of birth missing (living people)
21st-century LGBT people